Petra Zdechovanová (born 2 November 1995) is a Slovak footballer who plays as a defender for Mitech Żywiec in the Polish Ekstraliga Kobiet and has appeared for the Slovakia women's national team.

Career
Zdechovanová has been capped for the Slovakia national team, appearing for the team during the 2019 FIFA Women's World Cup qualifying cycle.

References

External links
 
 
 

1995 births
Living people
Slovak women's footballers
Slovakia women's international footballers
Women's association football defenders
Expatriate women's footballers in Poland
Slovak expatriate sportspeople in Poland
TS Mitech Żywiec players